The 1882 MIT Engineers football team was an American football team that represented the Massachusetts Institute of Technology as an independent during the 1882 college football season. The team compiled a 1–4 record.

Schedule

References

MIT
MIT Engineers football seasons
College football winless seasons
MIT Engineers football